The 1993 Tour du Haut Var was the 25th edition of the Tour du Haut Var cycle race and was held on 20 February 1993. The race started in Seillans and finished in Draguignan. The race was won by Thierry Claveyrolat.

General classification

References

1993
1993 in road cycling
1993 in French sport